Dan Jones may refer to:

Football players
 Dan Jones (American football) (born 1970), American football player
 Dan Jones (New Zealand footballer), New Zealand international footballer
 Dan Jones (footballer, born 1994), British professional footballer for Port Vale
 Dan Jones (footballer, born 2000s), Welsh footballer for Forest Green Rovers
 Dan Jones (rugby union) (born 1996), Welsh rugby player

Other people
 Dan Jones (Mormon) (1810–1862), Welsh-American Latter-day Saint missionary, sailor, and pioneer
 Dan Jones (politician) (1908–1985), British politician, MP for Burnley 1959–1983
 Dan Jones (composer), British composer and sound designer
 Dan Jones (writer) (born 1981), British writer, historian and journalist
 Dan Jones (professor) (born 1952), American writer and professor
 Dan Jones (digital creative director) (born 1979), British creative director, digital producer and television producer
 Dan E. Jones, American educator and political pollster
 Dan Jones (human rights education activist) (born 1940), British artist, collector of children's playground songs and human rights campaigner

Fictional characters
 Dan Jones (Madonsela Mpho), fictional child character in Shining Time Station

See also
 Daniel Jones (disambiguation)
 Danny Jones (disambiguation)
 Jones (surname)